"Nobody Gets Me" is a song by American singer SZA. It was sent to Italian radio stations through Sony Music on January 6, 2023, as the fourth single from her second studio album, SOS (2022). The song peaked at number ten on the US Billboard Hot 100, the Canadian Hot 100, and the Official New Zealand Music Chart.

Background 
SZA released her debut studio album, Ctrl, in 2017. Primarily an R&B album that deals with themes like heartbreak, it received widespread acclaim for its vocals and eclectic musical style, as well as the emotional impact and confessional nature of its songwriting. The album brought SZA to mainstream fame, and critics credit it with establishing her status as a major figure in contemporary pop and R&B music and pushing the boundaries of the R&B genre. Her next studio album was therefore highly anticipated, and she alluded to its completion as early as August 2019 during an interview with DJ Kerwin Frost.

Commenting on the creative process behind the album, SZA stated it would be as candid and personal as Ctrl: "This next album is even more of me being less afraid of who am I when I have no choice? When I'm not out trying to curate myself and contain." When SZA collaborated with Cosmopolitan for their February 2021 issue, she spoke about her creative process behind the album's conception. She said: "this album is going to be the shit that made me feel something in my...here and in here", pointing to her heart and gut.

From April to May 2022, SZA told media outlets that she had recently finished the album in Hawaii and said it was her most relatable or "unisex" body of work she had made to date. During an interview with Complex, she described the album's composition, "I have no idea what it sounds like to anybody else. I really don't know. It's so bizarre. It's weird that I can't put my finger on it. It's a little bit of everything", adding that certain tracks in the album had a soft or balladic sound. SZA, in a Consequence cover story, further commented on her plans to experiment with various genres. She asserted it was "lazy" to reduce her to an R&B artist: "Black music doesn't have to just be R&B[...] Why can't we just be expansive and not reductive?"

During a Billboard cover story published in November, SZA revealed that the title of her second album was SOS, scheduled for release sometime next month. On December 3, 2022, she announced it would be released on December 9, and two days later, she posted the track list on Twitter. Out of 23 songs, "Nobody Gets Me" appears as the album's 14th track. The same day, SZA posted a snippet of the song on her YouTube account.

Music and lyrics 
SZA and Punch, president of her record label Top Dawg Entertainment, spoke in length about SOS sound during an interview with Rolling Stone. The album's composition is eclectic; while SZA incorporated elements of "traditional" R&B into the album, she also took inspiration from several artists in jazz, hip hop, alternative rock, and country music. About the wide range of musical styles incorporated into SOS, Punch commented: "It's a new chapter. She's not scared to try certain things now." "Nobody Gets Me", a ballad backed by an acoustic guitar, combines two of these genres—alternative rock and country—with a contemporary folk musical style. 

In the lyrics, SZA recalls memories she made with her ex-fiancé, narrates all the events that strained their relationship and led to their break-up, and explains how she has felt in the aftermath. SZA spoke about the song's story in a radio station interview prior to the album's release; she told the host that breaking up with him was like banishing herself to hell for the rest of her life because he was the only person whom she thought could understand her feelings. She tried rekindling their relationship, but she turned out to regret her decision, and she also compared the experience to going to hell.

The first verse recounts a drunken argument they had at the MGM Grand shortly after they had sex: "you were balls deep, now we beefin'". She talks about how she screamed "fuck that" towards him, saying that even though she could barely remember it because she was drunk, she meant what she told him. Writing for The Quietus, CJ Thorpe-Tracey argued that the line was the lyric that best summarized SOS, because to him it aptly captured a recurring theme in the album in which SZA gets into several arguments with her ex-partners and tries to get over them quickly using coping mechanisms like sex. She returns to the present in the next few lines, urging him to "stick it in 'fore the memories get to kicking in" knowing that they both will regret it.

Critical reception 
Vulture and The Sydney Morning Herald praised the song's vocals, whereas Variety praised the melodic arrangement.

Charts

Certification

Release history

Notes

References

2020s ballads
2023 singles
2022 songs
Alternative rock ballads
Country ballads
Folk ballads
RCA Records singles
Songs written by SZA
Songs written by Benny Blanco
SZA songs
Top Dawg Entertainment singles